Keyacris is a genus of grasshoppers belonging to the family Morabidae.

The species of this genus are found in Southern Australia.

Species:

Keyacris interpres 
Keyacris marcida 
Keyacris scurra

References

Morabidae